Seoul Olympic Park, shortened to Olpark, is an Olympic Park built to host the 1988 Summer Olympics. It is located in Bangi-dong, Songpa-gu, Seoul, South Korea. The two nearest subway stations are Mongchontoseong and Olympic Park.

Competition facilities 
 SK Olympic Handball Gymnasium – formerly known as Olympic Fencing Gymnasium
 Olympic Gymnastics Arena
 Olympic Swimming Pool
 Olympic Tennis Courts
 Olympic Velodrome

Other facilities 
 Olympic Weightlifting Gymnasium – currently known as Woori Art Hall
 Korea National Sports University
 Mongchontoseong
 Olympic Sculpture Park (It houses approximately 200 sculptures done by artists of all around the World, expressing different concepts)
 Olympic Parktel Hotel
 Olympic Hall
 Olympic Museum
 SOMA Museum of Art
 World Peace Gate
 Flag Plaza (with the presence of the flags of the countries that competed in the 1988 Summer Olympics)
 Rose Park
 Waterside Stage
 Music Fountain

World Peace Gate
Built between December 31, 1986, and August 31, 1988, it was designed by the architect Kim Chung-up to celebrate the motto and the concepts from Seoul 1988 Summer Olympic Games (peace and harmony) and also to symbolize the ability of the Korean people. Alongside the pillars there are structures similar to wings, under which there's a mural called "A Painting of Four Spirits". In the mural are shown a phoenix, a turtle, a tiger and a dragon (the spirits that guard the gate) ascending towards heaven, representing the strength of Koreans and their freedom.

Under the gate is the 1988 Summer Paralympics eternal flame, as well as a declaration of peace calling for world harmony and happiness for all citizens of the world.

See also
 Olympic Stadium (Seoul)

References

External links

Official website

 
Sports venues in Seoul
Venues of the 1988 Summer Olympics
Olympic Parks
Buildings and structures in Songpa District
Parks in Seoul